Aly Spaltro, better known by her stage name Lady Lamb (formerly called Lady Lamb the Beekeeper) is an American songwriter and musician.  Spaltro first began writing music in 2007 while working at Bart & Greg's DVD Explosion, the local video rental store in her hometown of Brunswick, Maine. She is a Brunswick High School graduate. Spaltro worked the closing shift, and would experiment with and record music all night into the morning. The first Lady Lamb recordings were home recordings distributed in handmade packages to the local Bullmoose Record Store in Brunswick.

In 2010, Spaltro moved to Brooklyn, New York. In 2012, Spaltro met producer Nadim Issa and recorded her debut studio record, Ripely Pine at Let Em In Music in Gowanus, Brooklyn. It was released February 19, 2013 on Brooklyn's Ba Da Bing Records.

In 2014, Spaltro recorded and co-produced her sophomore studio album, After, with Nadim Issa at Let Em In Music. Late that same year, Spaltro signed with Mom + Pop Music and released the album After on March 3, 2015. In December 2016 she released the seven track EP "Tender Warriors Club".

In 2019, Spaltro released Even in the Tremor, her third studio album.

Discography

Studio albums

EPs

Singles

References

Singers from Maine
Living people
Musicians from Brooklyn
American banjoists
American multi-instrumentalists
People from Brunswick, Maine
21st-century American women guitarists
21st-century American guitarists
1989 births
Guitarists from Maine
21st-century American women singers
Brunswick High School (Maine) alumni
21st-century American singers
Mom + Pop Music artists